Mayagüez Bay is a bay located in western Puerto Rico.

The bay has recently been opened to the city of Mayagüez with the building of the Parque del Litoral because of the 2010 Central American and Caribbean Games. The Port of Mayagüez is located in the bay.  The Yagüez River empties into the bay.

See also
San Juan Bay
Transportation in Puerto Rico

Mayagüez, Puerto Rico
Bays of the Caribbean
Bays of Puerto Rico